The Golden Rose is a gold ornament, which popes of the Catholic Church have traditionally blessed annually. It is occasionally conferred as a token of reverence or affection. Recipients have included churches and sanctuaries, royalty, military figures, and governments.

Significance and symbolism 

The rose is blessed on the fourth Sunday of Lent, Lætare Sunday (also known as Rose Sunday), when rose-coloured vestments and draperies substitute for the penitential purple, symbolizing hope and joy in the midst of Lenten solemnity. Throughout most of Lent, Catholics pray, fast, perform penance, and meditate upon the malice of sin and its negative effects; but Rose Sunday is an opportunity to look beyond Christ's death at Calvary and forward to His joyous Resurrection. The beautiful Golden Rose symbolizes the Risen Christ of glorious majesty. (The Messiah is hailed "the flower of the field and the lily of the valleys" in the Bible.) The rose's fragrance, according to Pope Leo XIII, "shows the sweet odor of Christ which should be widely diffused by His faithful followers" (Acta, vol. VI, 104), and the thorns and red tint of the petals refer to His bloody Passion.

Many popes, on the occasion of conferring the Rose, have in sermons and letters explained its mystical significance. Innocent III said: "As Lætare Sunday, the day set apart for the function, represents love after hate, joy after sorrow, and fullness after hunger, so does the rose designate by its colour, odour and taste, love, joy and satiety respectively," also comparing the rose to the flower referred to in Isaiah 11:1: "There shall come forth a rod out of the root of Jesse, and a flower shall rise up out of his root."

History and development of the modern Rose

Workmanship 
The blossom

Before the pontificate of Sixtus IV (1471–84) the Golden Rose consisted of a simple and single blossom made of pure gold and slightly tinted with red.  Later, to embellish the ornament while still retaining the mystical symbolism, the gold was left untinted but rubies and afterwards many precious gems were placed in the heart of the rose or on its petals.

Pope Sixtus IV substituted in place of the single rose a thorny branch with leaves and many (ten or more) roses, the largest of which sprang from the top of the branch with smaller roses clustering around it. In the center of the principal rose was a tiny cup with a perforated cover, into which the pope poured musk and balsam to bless the rose. The whole ornament was of pure gold. This 'Sistine' design was maintained but varied as to decoration, size, weight and value. Originally it was little over three inches in height, and was easily carried in the Pope's left hand as he blessed the multitude with his right hand, when passing in procession from the church of Santa Croce in Gerusalemme (in Rome) to the Lateran Palace. Afterwards, especially when a vase and large pedestal became part of the ornament, a robust cleric was required to carry it, preceding the papal cross in the procession. The rose sent to Wilhelmina Amalia of Brunswick, wife of Joseph I, afterwards emperor, by Innocent XI, weighed twenty pounds and was almost eighteen inches high. It was in bouquet form, with three twisting branches that came together after many windings at the top of the stem, supporting a large rose and cluster of leaves.

Vase and pedestal

The vase and the pedestal supporting it have varied as to material, weight, and form. In the beginning they were made of gold; but afterward of silver heavily gilt with gold. The pedestal can be either triangular, quadrangular, or octangular, and is richly ornamented with various decorations and bas-reliefs. In addition to the customary inscription, the coat of arms of the pope who had the ornament made, and that of he who blessed and conferred it, are engraved on the pedestal.

Value of the ornament 

The value of the rose varies according to the munificence of the pontiffs or the economic circumstances of the times.
Baldassari (1709)   says that the rose conferred about the year 1650 cost about 500 scudi d'oro (equivalent of about 1.7 kg of gold).
The two roses sent by Pope Alexander VII were valued at about 800 and 1200 scudi respectively. Pope Clement IX sent the Queen of France one costing about 1600 scudi, made of eight pounds of gold. 
The workmanship on this rose was exceedingly fine, for which the artificer received the equivalent of 300 scudi. Innocent XI caused seven and one-half pounds of gold to be formed into a rose, which was further embellished with many sapphires, costing in all 1450 scudi.
Rock (1909) adds that in the 19th century not a few of the roses cost 2000 scudi and more.

Origin 
The custom of giving the rose supplanted the ancient practice of sending Catholic rulers the Golden Keys from St. Peter's Confessional, a custom introduced either by Pope Gregory II (716) or Pope Gregory III (740). A certain analogy exists between the rose and the keys: both are of pure gold blessed and bestowed by the pope upon illustrious Catholics, and also, both are somewhat reminiscent of a reliquary—the rose contains musk and balsam, the keys are filings from the Chair of St. Peter.

The exact date of the institution of the rose is unknown. According to some it is anterior to Charlemagne (742-814), according to others it had its origin at the end of the 12th century, but it certainly antedates the year 1050, since Pope Leo IX (1051) speaks of the rose as of an ancient institution at his time.

The custom, started when the popes moved to Avignon, of conferring the rose upon the most deserving prince at the papal court, continued after the papacy moved back to Rome. The prince would receive the rose from the pope in a solemn ceremony and be accompanied by the College of Cardinals from the papal palace to his residence. From the beginning of the seventeenth century, the rose was sent only to queens, princesses and eminent noblemen. Emperors, kings and princes were given a blessed sword and hat as a more suitable gift. However, if a deserving Catholic emperor, king or other great prince was present in Rome on Lætare Sunday, he would be presented with the rose.

The office of carrying and conferring the rose upon those living outside of Rome was given by the pope to cardinal legates a latere, nuncios, inter-nuncios and Apostolic ablegates. In 1895 a new office, called "Bearer of the Golden Rose" or "Keeper of the Golden Rose", destined for Members of Royal Houses (not hereditary), was instituted, and assigned to a secret chamberlain of sword and cloak participant, a rank within the Papal Household, but it was abolished in a series of reforms in 1968 by Pope Paul VI.

Blessing of the Rose 

The earliest roses were not blessed; instead, blessing was introduced to render the ceremony more solemn and induce greater reverence for it on the part of the recipient. According to Cardinal Petra (Comment. in Constit. Apostolicas, III, 2, col. 1), Pope Innocent IV (1245–54) was the first to bless it. However, others claim that Pope Innocent III (1198–1216), Pope Alexander III (1159–81) or Pope Leo IX (1049–55) was the first.  It is said that Leo IX, in 1051, obliged the monastery (nuns) of Bamberg in Franconia, to furnish a Golden Rose to be blessed and carried on Laetare Sunday each year (Theop. Raynaud, De rosa mediana a pontifice consecrata, IV, 413). Pope Benedict XIV attests that the ceremony of blessing originated at the end of the 14th or the beginning of the 15th century. Catalanus, papal master of ceremonies, believes that even the earliest roses were anointed with musk and balsam, but the blessing with prayers, incense, and holy water had its inception later on, sometime before pontificate of Pope Julius II (1503–13). Currently, the pope blesses the rose every year, but it is not always a new and different rose; the old one is used until it has been given away.

Originally (before the papacy moved to Avignon) the rose was blessed in the Hall of Vestments (sacristy) in the palace where the pope was; but the solemn Mass and the donation of the rose took place in the Santa Croce in Gerusalemme (a figure, according to Pope Innocent III, of the heavenly Jerusalem). The blessing was followed by a solemn Mass sung either by the pope himself or the first Cardinal Priest. In the former case the rose was placed on a veil of rose-colored silk richly embroidered with gold; in the latter the pope held the rose in his hand, except while kneeling, or during the Introit, Confiteor, Elevation and the singing of "Laudemus in Domino".  Rose in hand, the pope returned processionally to the Lateran Palace; the Prefect of Rome led his horse by the bridle and aided him in dismounting.  Upon arrival, he gave the rose to the Prefect, as a recompense for these acts of respect and homage. Before 1305, the rose was given in Rome to no foreigner, except to the Emperor on the day of his coronation. While residing at Avignon (1305–1375), the popes, unable to visit Roman churches and basilicas, performed many of their sacred functions, among them the blessing of the rose, in the private chapel of their palace (whence the origin of the Cappella Pontificia). On their return to Rome they (Sixtus V excepted) retained this custom.

The blessing of the rose now takes place in the Hall of Vestments (camera dei parimenti), and the solemn Mass in the papal chapel. The rose is placed on a table with lighted candles, and the pope, vested in alb and rose-colored stole and cope with precious mitre on his head, begins the ceremony with the usual versicles and the following poetical prayer:

"O God! by Whose word and power all things have been created, by Whose will all things are directed, we humbly beseech Thy Majesty, Who art the joy and gladness of all the faithful, that Thou wouldst deign in Thy fatherly love to bless and sanctify this rose, most delightful in odour and appearance, which we this day carry in sign of spiritual joy, in order that the people consecrated by Thee and delivered from the yoke of Babylonian slavery through the favour of Thine only-begotten Son, Who is the glory and exultation of the people of Israel and of that Jerusalem which is our Heavenly mother, may with sincere hearts show forth their joy. Wherefore, O Lord, on this day, when the Church exults in Thy name and manifests her joy by this sign [the rose], confer upon us through her true and perfect joy and accepting her devotion of today; do Thou remit sin, strengthen faith, increase piety, protect her in Thy mercy, drive away all things adverse to her and make her ways safe and prosperous, so that Thy Church, as the fruit of good works, may unite in giving forth the perfume of the ointment of that flower sprung from the root of Jesse and which is the mystical flower of the field and lily of the valleys, and remain happy without end in eternal glory together with all the saints."

The prayer finished, the pope puts incense (handed by the cardinal-deacon) into the censer and incenses the balsam and then the musk, and afterwards puts the balsam and powdered musk into the tiny cup in the heart of the principal rose. He then incenses the rose and sprinkles it with holy water. It is then given to the youngest cleric of the Camera, who carries it in front of the pope to the chapel, where it is placed on the altar at the foot of the cross upon a richly embroidered silk veil, where it remains during the Mass sung by the first cardinal-priest. After the Mass, the rose is carried in procession before the pope to the sacristy, where it is carefully put away in a place set apart for it, until bestowed upon some worthy personage.

Recipients

Golden Roses have been awarded to people – men, women, and one married couple - as well as to states and churches.

Until the sixteenth century Golden Roses were usually awarded to male sovereigns.  From the sixteenth century onwards it became more common to award them to female sovereigns and to the wives of sovereigns. The last male to receive a Golden Rose was Francesco Loredan, Doge of Venice, in 1759. The last person to receive a Golden Rose was Grand Duchess Charlotte of Luxembourg, in 1956.

Among the principal churches to which the rose has been presented are St. Peter's Basilica (five roses), the Archbasilica of Saint John Lateran (four roses), and the Basilica di Santa Maria Maggiore (two roses).

 In the twentieth century Pius X, Benedict XV, John XXIII, and John Paul I made no awards of the Golden Rose. 
 Pius XI revived the practice which was continued by Pius XII.
 Paul VI (1963–1978) made five awards
 John Paul II (1978–2005) made ten awards
 Benedict XVI (2005–2013) made nineteen awards
 Francis has made five awards of the Golden Rose during his reign (in November 2013, July 2016, May and October 2017, June 2019)

Since Paul VI, all Golden Roses have been awarded to churches; all of Benedict XVI's awards were to Marian shrines.

Sources
 CATHOLIC ENCYCLOPEDIA: Golden Rose article "Golden Rose" by PMJ Rock, 1909.

External links
 
 Catholic Encyclopedia article "Golden Rose"

 
Easter liturgy